Anton Alberts may refer to:

Anton Alberts (architect) (1927–1999), Dutch architect
Anton Alberts (politician) (born 1970), South African politician